The Chicago and North Western Railway class J was a class of 310 American 2-8-2 locomotives. They were built between 1913 and 1923 by the American Locomotive Company. In addition, the Chicago, St. Paul, Minneapolis and Omaha Railway (the Omaha Road) acquired 32, and also classified them as class J.

Design
The locomotives had boiler pressed to  feeding steam to two cylinders that had a  bore and a  stroke. These were connected to  driving wheels.

The first 224 locomotives, built 1913 to 1919 had Baker valve gear, the last 118, built 1921 to 1923 had Young valve gear.

Construction 
The locomotives were built by the American Locomotive Company at their Schenectady, Richmond, and Dunkirk, plants.

Service 
They were used system-wide on freight trains, and became the principle freight-hauling locomotive on the railway.

The last seven locomotives built were equipped for oil firing from new; at least 18 more were retro-fitted in the 1930s and 1940s. These locomotives were used in Nebraska and Wyoming.

These locomotives were reclassified as J-A. With the onset of World War II, rebuildings ceased, but the fitting of stokers continued;  these stoker-fitted locomotives were re-classed as J-S.

Also during the war, several locomotives were leased to the Seaboard Air Line Railroad.

In 1944 the Chicago and North Western Railway traded two of its class J locomotives for the Omaha Road's two J-1 2-10-2 locomotives.

Retirements started in 1942, and continued until the end of steam in 1956.

No locomotives of this class have been preserved.

References 

J
2-8-2 locomotives
ALCO locomotives
Railway locomotives introduced in 1913
Steam locomotives of the United States
Standard gauge locomotives of the United States
Scrapped locomotives
Freight locomotives